Maruzen Intec Osaka Pool is a swimming venue in Osaka, Japan. It hosted the figure skating events for the 2000 Four Continents Figure Skating Championships.

See also
Osaka Municipal Central Gymnasium

External links
 Official website

Sports venues in Osaka
Swimming venues in Japan
Indoor arenas in Japan